The first season of Crazy Ex-Girlfriend premiered on The CW on October 12, 2015 and ran for 18 episodes until April 18, 2016. The season stars Rachel Bloom as Rebecca Bunch, a young lawyer who quits her job at a top-notch New York lawfirm and moves across the country to West Covina, California to follow an ex-boyfriend from her teenage years, Josh Chan, in the hopes of finding true happiness. Vincent Rodriguez III, Santino Fontana, Donna Lynne Champlin, Pete Gardner, and Vella Lovell co-star.

Cast

Main
 Rachel Bloom as Rebecca Bunch
 Vincent Rodriguez III as Josh Chan
 Santino Fontana as Greg Serrano
 Donna Lynne Champlin as Paula Proctor
 Pete Gardner as Darryl Whitefeather
 Vella Lovell as Heather Davis

Recurring
 Gabrielle Ruiz as Valencia Perez
 David Hull as White Josh
 Erick Lopez as Hector
 Gina Gallego as Mrs. Hernandez
 Steve Monroe as Scott Proctor
 Zayne Emory, and Steele Stebbins as Brendan and Tommy Proctor
 Rene Gube as Father Brah
 Tovah Feldshuh as Naomi Bunch
 Ava Acres as Young Rebecca
 Amy Hill and Alberto Issac as Lourdes and Joseph Chan
 Michael Hyatt as Dr. Noelle Akopian
 Michael McMillian as Tim
 Paul Welsh as Trent Maddock
 Stephnie Weir as Karen and Burl Moseley as Jim
 John Allen Nelson and Jay Huguley as Silas Bunch
 Robin Thomas as Marco Serrano
 Esther Povitsky as Maya
 Danny Jolles as George
 Rachel Grate as Audra Levine
 Tess Paras and Coryn Mabalot as Jayma and Jastenity Chan
 Benjamin Siemon as Brody, "Grocery Clerk with Half an Eyelid"
 Hunter Stiebel as Marty
 Michael Hitchcock as Bert
 Cedric Yarbrough as Calvin Young
 John Yuan and Matthew Yuan as Ben and David
 Clark Moore as AJ

Guest
 Olivia Edward as Madison Whitefeather
 Eugene Cordero as Alex
 Dan Gregor as Dr. Roth
 Dr. Phil as himself
 Amber Riley and Ricki Lake as the Dream Ghosts
 BJ Novak as himself
 Lea Salonga as Aunt Myrna
 Nipsey Hussle as himself

Episodes 

Every song listed is performed by Rebecca, except where indicated.

Production and development
The series was originally developed for Showtime, and a pilot was produced, but Showtime opted not to proceed with it on February 9, 2015. The CW picked up the series on May 7, 2015, for the Fall 2015–2016 season. The series has been extensively reworked for The CW, expanding the show format from a half-hour to a full hour and adjusting the content for broadcast television, as the original pilot was produced for premium cable. On October 5, 2015, shortly before the series premiere, The CW placed an order of five additional scripts. On November 23, 2015, the CW ordered another five episodes, raising the total for season 1 to 18 episodes.

Casting
On September 30, 2014, Santino Fontana, Donna Lynne Champlin, Vincent Rodriguez III and Michael McDonald joined Rachel Bloom in the series regular cast. With the move to The CW, the series went through casting changes and McDonald departed the cast. Shortly afterwards, Vella Lovell and Pete Gardner were added as regulars; with Lovell in the role of Heather, Rebecca's underachieving neighbor; and Gardner replacing McDonald in the role of Darryl, Rebecca's new boss.

Music
"Crazy Ex-Girlfriend: Original Television Soundtrack (Season 1 - Volume 1)" was released on February 19, 2016 in both explicit and clean versions. It includes all the songs from the first eight episodes of season one, alongside Bloom's a cappella rough demos of "Feeling Kinda Naughty", "I Have Friends", "Settle for Me", and "Sex with a Stranger" as well as Adam Schlesinger's demo version of "What'll It Be".

"Crazy Ex-Girlfriend: Original Television Soundtrack (Season 1 - Vol. 2)" was released on May 20, 2016. It includes all the songs from the last 10 episodes of season one, as well as demos of "JAP Battle", "I Could If I Wanted To", "Women Gotta Stick Together", "Group Hang", and "You Stupid Bitch".

Reception

Critical response
The first season of Crazy Ex-Girlfriend received critical acclaim. At Metacritic, which assigns a rating out of 100 to reviews from mainstream critics, the first season received "generally favorable reviews" with an average score of 78 based on 23 reviews. Review aggregation website Rotten Tomatoes gave the first season a 97% positive rating, with an average rating of 7.70 out of 10 based on reviews from 62 critics, with the site's consensus stating: "Lively musical numbers and a refreshing, energetic lead, Rachel Bloom, make Crazy Ex-Girlfriend a charming, eccentric commentary on human relationships."

Critics' year-end lists

Awards and nominations

Ratings

References 

Season
2015 American television seasons
2016 American television seasons